The 2015 Big East men's soccer tournament, was the third men's soccer tournament of the new Big East Conference, formed in July 2013 after the original Big East Conference split into two leagues along football lines. Including the history of the original conference, it was the 20th edition of the Big East tournament.

Qualification 

The top six teams in the Big East Conference based on their conference regular season records qualified for the tournament.

Bracket

Schedule

Quarterfinals

Semifinals

Big East Championship

Statistical leaders

Top goalscorers

Honors

All-Tournament team 

 Cory Brown, Xavier, So., D
Todd Pratzner, Xavier, Jr., D
Jeff Kilday, Providence, RS-Sr., M 
Julian Gressel, Providence, Jr., M
Fabian Herbers, Creighton, Jr., M/F
Ricardo Perez, Creighton, Jr., M/F
Connor Sparrow, Creighton, Sr., GK
JT Marcinkowski, Georgetown, Fr., GK
Brandon Allen, Georgetown, Sr., F
Joshua Yaro, Georgetown, Jr., D
Alex Muyl, Georgetown, Jr., F

Tournament MVPs 

 most outstanding defensive player: Joshua Yaro, Georgetown
 most outstanding offensive player: Brandon Allen, Georgetown

See also 
 Big East Conference
 2015 Big East Conference men's soccer season
 2015 NCAA Division I men's soccer season
 2015 NCAA Division I Men's Soccer Championship

References 

tournament 2015
Big East Men's Soccer
Big East Men's Soccer
Big East Men's Soccer
Big East Men's Soccer